June 2014

See also

References

 06
June 2014 events in the United States